This is a list of notable Kurds, chronologically listed:

6th century-15th century 

Jaban al-Kurdi (6th century)
Mir Jafar Dasni (d. c. 841)
Ibn al-Dahhak (d. 927)
Muhammad ibn Husayn al-Rawadi (d. c. 953–956)
Muhammad ibn Shaddad (d. 955)
Daysam ibn Ibrahim al-Kurdi (d. c. 957)
Evdilsemedê Babek (972–1019)
Lashkari ibn Muhammad (d. 978)
Hasanwayh (d. 979)
Badr ibn Hasanwayh
Marzuban ibn Muhammad ibn Shaddad (d. 985)
Pîr Mansûr (d. 989)
Abu Nasr Husayn II
Ali Hariri (1009–1079/80)
Abu’l-Fatḥ Moḥammad b. ʿAnnāz (d. 1010/1)
Zahir ibn Hilal ibn Badr
Hilal ibn Badr
Fadluya
Fadl ibn Muhammad (d. 1031)
Abu'l-Fath Musa
Lashkari ibn Musa
Abu Nasr Mamlan II
Abu Mansur Wahsudan (d. 1059)
Abu'l-Aswar Shavur ibn Fadl (d. 1067)
Anushirvan ibn Lashkari (d. c. 1067)
Ashot ibn Shavur
Manuchihr ibn Shavur
Fadl ibn Shavur (d. 1073)
Fadlun ibn Fadl
Badh ibn Dustak (d. 1093/6)
Fakhr-un-Nisa (11th century)
Firuz-Shah Zarrin-Kolah (11th century)
Ibn al-Azraq al-Fariqi (1116–1176)
Abu'l-Aswar Shavur ibn Manuchihr
Fadl ibn Shavur ibn Manuchihr
Fakr al-Din Shaddad ibn Mahmud
Saladin (1137–1193)
Al-Adil I (1145–1218)
Fadl ibn Mahmud
Sayf al-Din al-Amidi (1156–1233)
Ali ibn al-Athir (1160–1233)
Shahanshah ibn Mahmud
Al-Afdal ibn Salah ad-Din (c. 1169–1225)
Shirkuh (d. 1169)
Az-Zahir Ghazi (1172–1216)
Najm ad-Din Ayyub (d. 1173)
Sultan ibn Mahmud
Al-Ashraf Musa (1178–1237)
Al-Mu'azzam Isa (1176–1227)
Al-Kamil (1117–1238)
Turan-Shah (d. 1180)
Ibn al-Salah (1181–1245)
Al-Mu'azzam Turanshah ibn Salah al-Din (c. 1181 – 1260)
Bahramshah
Farrukh Shah (d. 1182)
Muhammad ibn Shirkuh (d. 1186)
Al-Mansur Nasir al-Din Muhammad (1189– c. 1216)
Al-Muzaffar I Umar (d. 1191)
Tughtakin ibn Ayyub (d. 1197)
Al-Aziz Uthman (d. 1198)
Al-Mansur I Muhammad (12th century)
Fakhraddin (12th century)
Izz al-Din Usama (12th century)
Masud ibn Namdar (12th century)
Mehmed Reshan (12th century)
Nasirdin (12th century)
Sejadin (12th century)
Al-Awhad Ayyub (d. 1210)
Al-Adil II (1221–1248)
An-Nasir Yusuf (1228–1260)
Al-Mujahid (d. 1240)
As-Salih Ayyub (1205–1249)
An-Nasir Dawud (1206–1261)
Al-Aziz Muhammad (c. 1213–1236)
Sitt al-Sham (d. 1220)
Al-Ashraf Musa, Emir of Homs (1229–1263)
Dayfa Khatun (d. 1242)
As-Salih Ismail (d. 1245)
Al-Mansur Ibrahim (d. 1246)
Al-Muzaffar Ghazi (d. 1247)
Ibn al-Hadjib (d. 1249)
Al-Ashraf Musa, Sultan of Egypt
Al-Muazzam Turanshah (d. 1250)
Safi-ad-din Ardabili (1252/3–1334)
Sulaiman Shah (d. 1258)
Abulfeda (1273–1332)
Al-Kamil Muhammad (d. 1260)
Shabankara'i (1298–1358)
Al-Shahrazuri (13th century)
Amadin (13th century)
Husam al-Din Chalabi (13th century)
Khatuna Fekhra (13th century)
Saʿd al-Din al-Humaidi (13th century)
Sheikh Mand (13th century)
Sheikh Obekr (13th century)
Sadr al-Din Musa (1305–1391)
Zain al-Din al-'Iraqi (1325–1404)
Nusrat al-Din Ahmad (d. 1330)
Al-Afdal Muhammad (d. 1341)
Mele Perîşan (1356–1431)
Sayyid Husayn Ahlati (d. 1397)
Mela Huseynê Bateyî (1417–1495)
Izz al-Din Shir (d. 1423)
Khvajeh Ali Safavi (d. 1427)
Idris Bitlisi (1457–1520)
Shaykh Junayd (d. 1460)
Ismail I (1487–1524)
Hosam al-Din Ali Bitlisi (d. 1494/5)
Mahmud the Kurd (15th century)
Sultan Sahak (late 14th century to early 15th century)

16th century-19th century 

Sharafkhan Bidlisi (1543–1603)
Şêx Şemsedînê Exlatî (1558–1674)
Abd-al-Baqi Nahavandi (1570–1632)
Melayê Cizîrî (1570–1640)
Asenath Barzani (1590–1670)
Feqiyê Teyran (1590–1660)
Halo Khan Ardalan
Yusuf Yaska (1592–1636)
Shir Sarim (16th century)
Ezidi Mirza (1600–1651)
Ali Janbulad (d. 1610)
Ibrahim al-Kurani (1615–1690)
Ganj Ali Khan (d. 1624/5)
Soleyman Khan Ardalan
Shahrokh Sultan Zanganeh (d. 1639)
Mistefa Bêsaranî (1642–1701)
Ahmad Khani (1650–1707)
Ali Mardan Khan (d. 1657)
Shaykh Ali Khan Zanganeh (d. 1689)
Ali Beg Zanganeh (17th century)
Mir Xanzad (17th century)
Sarı Süleyman Bey (17th century)
Khana Qubadi (1700–1759)
Almas Khan-e Kanoule'ei (1706–1777)
Mohamed Pasha Jaff (b. 1714)
Shahqoli Khan Zanganeh (d. 1716)
Marif Nodeyi (1753–1838/9)
Xelîlê Sêrtî (1754–1843)
Zaro Aga (1764–1934)
Al-Barzanjī (d. 1764)
Khulam Rada Khan Arkawazi (1765–1834)
Suleiman al-Halabi (1777–1800)
Khâlid-i Shahrazuri (1779–1827)
Uthman Sirâj-ud-Dîn Naqshbandi (1781–1867)
Muhammad Pasha of Rawanduz (1783–1838)
Şeyda Hewramî (1784–1852)
Allahqoli Khan Zanganeh (d. 1785)
Aziz Khan Mokri (1792–1871)
Ahmad Bag Komasi (1796–1877)
Mahmud Bayazidi (1797–1859)
Yaqub Maydashti (1799–1871)
Abdullah Pasha Bajalan (18th century)
Elî Teremaxî (17th century or 18th century)
Haydar Khan Zanganeh (18th century)
Ibrahim Pasha al-Dalati (18th century)
Nalî (1800–1856)
Salim (1800–1866)
Bedir Khan Beg (1803–1869)
Mastoureh Ardalan (1805–1848)
Mawlawi Tawagozi (1806–1882/3)
Kurdî (1806/12–1850)
Jafar Qoli Khan Donboli (d. 1814)
Haji Qadir Koyi (1817–1897)
Kurt İsmail Hakkı Pasha (1818-1897)
Hasan Ali Khan Garrusi (1820-1900)
Wali Dewane (1826–1881)
Mirza Mohammad Reza Kalhor (1829–1892)
Mahwi (1830–1906)
Said Pasha Kurd (1834–1907)
Riza Talabani (1835–1910)
Mustafa Zihni Pasha (1838–1929)
Ibrahim Pasha Milli (1843–1908)
Wafayi (1844–1902)
Bedri Pasha Bedir Khan (1847–1911)
Lady Adela (1847–1924)
Mirza Ebdilqadire Paweyi (1850–1910)
Abdulkadir Ubeydullah (1851–1925)
Emin Ali Bedir Khan (1851–1926)
Diyap Yıldırım (1852–1932)
Osman Efendîyo Babij (1852–1929)
Saeb (1854–1910)
Hariq (1856–1909)
Mikdad Midhat Bedir Khan (1858–1915)
Edeb (1860–1918)
Sabat Islambouli (b. 1860s–1941)
Shamdin Agha (d. 1860)
Sheikh Ali Hisam-ad-Din Naqshbandi (1861–1939)
Seyid Riza (1863–1937)
Abdürrezzak Bedir Khan (1864–1918)
Cheragh-Ali Khan Zanganeh (d. 1864)
Abdulhakim Arvasi (1865–1943)
Mevlanzade Rifat Bey (1865–1930)
Sheikh Said (1865–1925)
Şerif Pasha (1865–1951)
Ehmedê Xasî (1866/7–1951)
Haji Mala Saeed Kirkukli Zada (1866–1937)
Mustafa Yamulki (1866–1936)
Han Mahmud (d. 1866)
Piramerd (1867–1950)
İshak Sükuti (1868–1902)
Abdullah Cevdet (1869–1932)
Faramarz Asadi (1869–1969)
Ibrahim Hananu (1869–1935)
Hajj Nematollah (1871–1920)
Kurd Fuad Pasha
Kurd Ahmet Izzet Pasha (1871–1920)
Meyan Khatun (1873/4–1957/8)
Jangir Agha (1874–1943)
Narî (1874–1944)
Muhammad Kurd Ali (1876–1953)
Said Nursî (1877–1960)
Aziz Feyzi Pirinççizâde (1878–1933)
Mahmud Barzanji (1878–1956)
Ahmed Uthman (1879–1946)
Kâzım İnanç (1880-1938)
Abdullah Beg Benari (1880–1939)
Muhammad Amin Zaki (1880–1948)
Hasan Hayri (1881–1925)
Mufti Penjweni (1881–1952)
Halid Beg Cibran (1882–1925)
Haji Baba Sheikh (1882–1947)
Sayed Ali Asghar Kurdistani (1882–1936)
Süreyya Bedir Khan (1883–1938)
Sheikh Ubeydullah (d. 1883)
Celal İbrahim (1884–1917)
İsmet İnönü (1884–1973)
Ali Saip Ursavaş (1885–1939)
Simko Shikak (1887–1930)
Halis Öztürk (1889–1977)
Abdul Aziz Yamulki (1890–1981)
Bakr Sidqi (1890–1937)
Ekrem Cemilpaşa (1891–1973)
Taufiq Wahby (1891–1984)
Hapsa Khan (1891–1953)
Ihsan Nuri (1892/3–1976)
Celadet Alî Bedirxan (1893–1951)
Nuri Dersimi (1893–1973)
Qazi Muhammad (1893–1947)
Mohammad Hosni (1894–1969)
Gholamreza Rashid-Yasemi (1895–1951)
Kamuran Alî Bedirxan (1895–1978)
Nur Ali Elahi (1895–1974)
Ahmed Barzani (1896–1969)
Sheikh Nuri Sheikh Salih Sheikh Ghani Barzinji (b. 1896)
Arab Shamilov (1897–1978)
Husni al-Za'im (1897–1949)
Ahmed Mukhtar Jaff (1898–1934)
Qani (1898–1965)
Rafiq Hilmi (1898–1960)
Kara Fatima Khanum (19th century)
Kunj Yusuf Pasha (19th century)
Osman Pasha Jaff (19th century)
Yezdanşêr (19th century)

20th century

1900s–1940s

Abdul Karim Mudarris (1901–2005)
Muhammad Wali Kermashani (1901–?)
Cigerxwîn (1903–1984)
Leyla Bedir Khan (1903–1986)
Mustafa Barzani (1903–1979)
Abdullah Goran (1904–1962)
Ali Merdan (1904–1981)
Karim Sanjabi (1905–1995)
Osman Sabri (1905–1993)
Emînê Evdal (1906–1964)
Abdolqader Zahedi (1907–2005)
Alaaddin Sajadi (1907–1984)
Nado Makhmudov (1907–1990)
Heciyê Cindî (1908–1990)
Qanate Kurdo (1909–1985)
Samand Siabandov (1909–1989)
Qedrîcan (1911–1972)
Khalid Bakdash (1912–1995)
Mohammad Ghazi (1913–1998)
Ibrahim Ahmad (1914–2000)
Ahmed Kuftaro (1915–2004)
Wansa (1917–2015)
Dildar (1918–1948)
Saleh Yousefi (1918–1981)
Nûredin Zaza (1919–1988)
Ibrahim Amin Baldar (1920–1998)
Musa Anter (1920–1992)
Abdurrahman Sharafkandi (1921–1991)
Daham Miro (1921–2010)
Ezaddin Husseini (1921–2011)
Hassan Zirak (1921–1973)
Hemin Mukriyani (1921–1986)
Mustafa Pasha Bajalan (d. 1921)
Ahmad Hardi (1922–2006)
Tahir Tewfiq (1922–1987)
Baba Mardoukh Rohanee (1923–1989)
Yaşar Kemal (1923–2015)
Karim Zand (1924–2017)
Taha Muhie-eldin Marouf (1924–2009)
Xelîlê Çaçan Mûradov (1924–1981)
Abdel Hamid al-Sarraj (1925–2013)
Ghader Abdollahzadeh (1925–2009)
Mohammad Mamle (1925–1999)
Siamak Yasemi (1925–1994)
Karim Hisami (1926–2001)
Moshe Barazani (1926–1947)
Ahmed Arif (1927–1991)
Mehdi Halıcı (1927–2008)
Muhamad Salih Dilan (1927–1990)
Shami Kermashani (1927–1984)
Turgut Özal (1927–1993)
Akram Hamid Begzadeh Jaff (1929–2010)
Kâmran İnan (1929–2015)
Muhammad Said Ramadan al-Bouti (1929–2013)
Nusrat Bhutto (1929–2011)
Abdul Rahman Ghassemlou (1930–1989)
Cemal Süreya (1931–1990)
Medet Serhat (1931–1994)
Ibrahim Heski (d. 1931)
Nadir Nadirov (1932–2021)
Ordîxanê Celîl (1932–2007)
Shahab Sheikh Nuri (1932–1976)
Hemoye Shero (d. 1932)
Ahmad Moftizadeh (1933–1993)
Jalal Talabani (1933–2017)
Jamal Nebez (1933–2018)
Khurto Hajji Ismail (1933–2020)
Tahseen Said (1933–2019)
Efat Ghazi (1935–1990)
Abdülmelik Fırat (1934–2009)
Usuv Beg (–1934)
Emerîkê Serdar (1935–2018)
Mehmed Emîn Bozarslan (1935–)
Adel Karasholi (1936–)
Ahmad Ghazi (1936–2015)
Ali Askari (1936–1978)
Celîlê Celîl (1936–)
Suwara Ilkhanizada (1937–)
Yılmaz Güney (1937–1984)
Ayşe Şan (1938–1996)
Fuad Masum (1938–)
Mahmoud Othman (1938–)
Mazhar Khaleqi (1938–)
Sadegh Sharafkandi (1938–1992)
Şerafettin Elçi (1938–2012)
Yaşar Kaya (1938–2016)
Jalal Dabagh (1939–)
Ferzende (d. 1939)
Zakia Hakki (1939–)
Mehdi Zana (1940–)
Sherko Bekas (1940–2013)
Abdul Rahman Haji Ahmadi (1941–)
Ali Ashraf Darvishian (1941–2017)
Eskerê Boyîk (1941–)
Mehmet Ali Birand (1941–2013)
Tosinê Reşîd (1941–)
Ahmet Türk (1942–)
Emre Taner (1942–)
Yusuf Ekinci (1942–1994)
Amir Hassanpour (1943–2017)
Dengir Mir Mehmet Fırat (1943–2019)
Necmettin Büyükkaya (1943–1984)
Soad Hosny (1943–2001)
Tofy Mussivand (1943–)
Idris Barzani (1944–1987)
Latif Rashid (1944–)
Mahmoud Ezidi (1944-1979)
Mahmud Baksi (1944–2000)
Nawshirwan Mustafa (1944–2017)
Rassul Mamand (1944–1994)
Yitzhak Mordechai (1944–)
Aref Tayfour (1945–)
Bahaedin Adab (1945–2007)
Munzur Çem (1945–2022)
Mustafa Hijri (1945–)
Rahmi Saltuk (1945–)
Rauf Hassan (1945–)
Rojen Barnas (1945–)
Abdulla Pashew (1946–)
Fuad Hussein (1946–)
Jawhar Namiq (1946–2011)
Khalil al-Zahawi (1946–2007)
Masoud Barzani (1946–)
Mojtaba Mirzadeh (1946–2005)
Sedigh Kamangar (1946–1989)
Şahînê Bekirê Soreklî (1946–)
Dilshad Meriwani (1947–1989)
Latif Halmat (1947–)
Mehmet Sıraç Bilgin (1944–2015)
Mohammad Saber Ismail (1947–)
Reşo Zîlan (1947–)
Rowsch Shaways (1947–2021)
Cankurd (1948–)
Foad Mostafa Soltani (1948–1979)
Hero Ibrahim Ahmed (1948–)
İhsan Arslan (1948–)
Keça Kurd (1948–)
Mihemed Şêxo (1948–1989)
Narmin Othman (1948–)
Omer Fattah Hussain (1948–)
Abbas Vali (1949–)
Abdulla Mohtadi (1949–)
Abdullah Öcalan (1949–)
Adel Murad (1949–2018)
Hüseyin Erdem (1949–)
Kamran Hedayati (1949–1996)
Mohammad Hossein Karimi (1949–1979)
Najmiddin Karim (1949–2020)
Têmûrê Xelîl (1949–)
Ramzi Nafi (1917–1949)

1950s-1970s 

Arsalan Baiz (1950–)
Behrouz Gharibpour (1950–)
Hacı Karay (1950–)
Homayoun Ardalan (1950–1992)
Hüseyin Kalkan (1950–)
Rafiq Sabir (1950–)
Salaheddine Bahaaeddin (1950–)
Shahram Nazeri (1950–)
Abdul Rahman Mustafa (1951–)
Cemîl Bayik (1951–)
Ferhad Shakely (1951–)
Pouran Derakhshandeh (1951–)
Salih Muslim (1951–)
Salim Barakat (1951–)
Abbas Kamandi (1952–2012)
Ali Haydar Kaytan (1952–)
Hüseyin Velioğlu (1952–2000)
Ibrahim Tatlises (1952–)
İsmail Özden (1952–2018)
Khalil Rashow (1952–)
Kosrat Rasul Ali (1952–)
Leyla Qasim (1952–1974)
Mahmut Alınak (1952–)
Mala Bakhtiyar (1952–)
Mehemed Malmîsanij (1952–)
Murat Bozlak (1952–2010)
Omar Hamdi (1952–2015)
Pîr Xidir Silêman (1952–2021)
Ali Haydar Yıldız (1953–1973)
Fawaz Hussain (1953–)
Hoshyar Zebari (1953–)
Jalal Barzanji (1953–)
Mohammad Tofiq Rahim (1953–)
Mehmed Uzun (1953–2007)
Orhan Miroğlu (1953–)
Yekta Uzunoğlu (1953–)
Murat Karayılan (1954–)
Najiba Ahmad (1954–)
Selim Sadak (1954–)
Fadıl Öztürk (1955–)
Hatip Dicle (1955–)
Hikmet Fidan (1955?–2005)
Ilana Eliya (1955–)
Imad Ahmad Sayfour (1955–)
Mohammed Haji Mahmoud (1955–)
Nasser Razazi (1955–)
Orhan Doğan (1955–2007)
Perwîz Cîhanî (1955–)
Rohat Alakom (1955–)
Şivan Perwer (1955–)
Abdulbaset Sieda (1956–)
Arjen Arî (1956–2012)
Cuneyd Zapsu (1956–)
Lokman Polat (1956–)
Mahsum Korkmaz (1956–1986)
Mazlum Doğan (1956–1982)
Mullah Krekar (1956–)
Nizamettin Arıç (1956–)
Musa Farisoğulları (1956–)
Ahmet Kaya (1957–2000)
Ali Akbar Moradi (1957–)
Ciwan Haco (1957–)
Dana Ahmed Majid (1957–)
Edip Yüksel (1957–)
Hesenê Metê (1957–)
Mustafa Aydogan (1957–)
Najmadin Shukr Rauf (1957–1985)
Sırrı Sakık (1957–)
Zafer Çağlayan (1957–)
Dilshad Said (1958–)
Kamal Qadir (1958–)
Mashaal Tammo (1958–)
Merziye Feriqi (1958–2005)
Mostafa Moloudi (1958–)
Nursel Aydoğan (1958–)
Osman Öcalan (1958–)
Serdar Roşan (1958–)
Seyed Khalil Alinezhad (1958–2001)
Sherzad Hafiz (1958–)
Tara Jaff (1958–)
Bakhtiar Amin (1959–)
Firat Cewerî (1959–)
İmam Taşçıer (1959–)
Müslüm Doğan (1959–)
Ata Nahai (1960–)
Barham Salih (1960–)
Bayan Nouri (1960–)
Edibe Şahin (1960–)
Eyaz Zaxoyî (1960–1986)
Jalal Jalalizadeh (1960–)
Salih Fırat (1960–)
Soraya Serajeddini (1960–2006)
Ali Bapir (1961–)
Amirkhan Mori (1961–)
Derwich Ferho (1961–)
Farhad Pirbal (1961–)
Guram Adzhoyev (1961–)
Gültan Kışanak (1961–)
Hassan Rahmanpanah (1961–)
Jano Rosebiani (1961–)
Leyla Zana (1961–)
Nizamettin Taş (1961–)
Saeed Farajpouri (1961–)
Savaş Buldan (1961–)
Zübeyir Aydar (1961–)
Abderrahman Sadik Karim (1962–)
Abdolreza Rajabi (1962–)
Adham Barzani (1962–)
Ardeshir Kamkar (1962–)
Hüseyin Kenan Aydın (1962–)
Adnan Karim (1963–)
Adnan Selçuk Mizrakli (1963–)
Azad Bonni (1963–)
Gülser Yıldırım (1963–)
Hülya Avşar (1963–)
Karim Mohammedzadeh (1963–1990)
Kayhan Kalhor (1963–)
Kemal Bülbül (1963–)
Mariwan Halabjaee (1963–)
Mohammad Seddigh Kaboudvand (1963–)
Seyran Ateş (1963–)
Mahir Hassan (1963-)
Fatma Kurtulan (1964–)
Hasan Saltık (1964–2021)
Huner Saleem (1964–)
Latif Yahia (1964–)
Leyla Güven (1964–)
Mano Khalil (1964–)
Nazand Begikhani (1964–)
Şeyhmus Dağtekin (1964–)
Yüksel Yavuz (1964–)
Aysel Tuğluk (1965–)
Ayşe Gökkan (1965–)
Bekir Bozdağ (1965–)
Bengi Yıldız (1965–)
Gurbetelli Ersöz (1965–1997)
Jan Dost (1965–)
Abdullah Demirbaş (1966–)
Bachtyar Ali (1966–)
Diyar Dersim (1966–)
İshak Sağlam (1966–)
Mahabad Qaradaghi (1966–2020)
Nechirvan Barzani (1966–)
Roya Toloui (1966–)
Tahir Elçi (1966–2015)
Yıldız Tilbe (1966–)
Zekeriya Yapıcıoğlu (1966–)
Alican Önlü (1967–)
Helîm Yûsiv (1967–)
Kajal Ahmad (1967–)
Mehmet Şimşek (1967–)
Meral Danış Beştaş (1967–)
Nadhim Zahawi (1967–)
Nalin Pekgul (1967–)
Pervin Buldan (1967–)
Yılmaz Erdoğan (1967–)
Ali Atalan (1968–)
Bejan Matur (1968–)
Gani Mirzo (1968–)
Fatih Mehmet Maçoğlu (1968–)
İbrahim Ayhan (1968–2018)
Metin Göktepe (1968–1996)
Xalîd Reşîd (1968–)
Bahman Ghobadi (1969–)
Bahoz Erdal (1969–)
Çağlar Demirel (1969–)
Dilsa Demirbag Sten (1969–)
Masrour Barzani (1969–)
Mohammad Oraz (1969–2003)
Mustafa Atici (1969–)
Sevahir Bayındır (1969–)
Widad Akrawi (1969–)
Amineh Kakabaveh (1970–)
Ayhan Bilgen (1970–)
Ayşe Polat (1970–)
Besime Konca (1970–)
Sara Kaya (1970–)
Sirwan Barzani (1970–)
Tuncer Bakırhan (1970–)
Ahmet Aslan (1971–)
Ahmet Aydın (1971–)
Asya Abdullah (1971–)
Dilba (1971–)
Gülnaz Karataş (1971–1992)
Hasret Gültekin (1971–1993)
Hozan Canê (1971–)
Jamil Rostami (1971–)
Mehmet Rüştü Tiryaki (1971–)
Osman Baydemir (1971–)
Selma Irmak (1971–)
Shahram Alidi (1971–)
Sibel Yiğitalp (1971–)
Vian Dakhil (1971–)
Abdullah Zeydan (1972–)
Azad Zal (1972–)
Eros Kurdi (1972–)
Hamdi Ulukaya (1972–)
Juwan Fuad Masum (1972–)
Nurettin Demirtaş (1972–)
Azad (1973–)
Bafel Talabani (1973–)
Herro Mustafa (1973–)
Houzan Mahmoud (1973–)
Kazim Öz (1973–)
Mehmet Yavuz (1973–2019)
Saliha Aydeniz (1973–)
Selahattin Demirtaş (1973–)
Servet Kocakaya (1973–)
Şehrîbana Kurdî (1973–)
Şevval Sam (1973–)
Choman Hardi (1974–)
Leyla Birlik (1974–)
Serhat Baran (1974–)
Seyed Ali Jaberi (1974–)
Aynur Doğan (1975–)
Bedia Özgökçe Ertan (1975–)
Celal Başkale (1975–2012)
Farzad Kamangar (c. 1975–2010)
Faysal Sarıyıldız (1975–)
Hisham Zaman (1975–)
Mehmet Ali Aslan (1975–)
Sadet Karabulut (1975–)
Sebahat Tuncel (1975–)
Sevim Dağdelen (1975–)
Vala Fareed (1975–)
Ayla Akat Ata (1976–)
Evrim Alataş (1976–2010)
Feleknas Uca (1976–)
Hemin Hawrami (1976–)
İdris Baluken (1976–)
Lahur Talabany (1976–)
Özlem Cekic (1976–)
Zara (Turkish singer) (1976–)
Bekir Kaya (1977–)
Dilan Yeşilgöz-Zegerius (1977–)
Gulan Avci (1977–)
Hişyar Özsoy (1977–)
Nisti Stêrk (1977–)
Omed Khoshnaw (1977–)
Qubad Talabani (1977–)
Shibal Ibrahim (c. 1977–)
Rojda Felat (1977–)
Birzo Majeed (1978–)
Blend Saleh (1978–)
Caucher Birkar (1978–)
Düzen Tekkal (1978–)
Firsat Sofi (1978–2020)
Kurd Maverick (1978–)
Rojda Aykoç (1978–)
Shahram Mokri (1978–)
Shaswar Abdulwahid (1978–)
Yousif Muhammed Sadiq (1978–)
Feryal Clark (1979–)
Mohsen Chavoshi (1979–)
Sheikh Ali Ilyas (1979–)
Zeynel Doğan (1979–)

1980s-2000s

Rojda Demirer (1980–)
Sherko Moarefi (1980–2013)
Mustafa Sarp (1980–)
Zuhal Demir (1980–)
Pervin Chakar (1981–)
Golriz Ghahraman (1981–)
Hawar Mulla Mohammed (1981–)
Khalid Mushir (1981–)
Khanna Omarkhali (1981–)
Remziye Tosun (1981–)
Selçuk Şahin (footballer born 1981)
Sinan Kaloğlu (1981–)
Xatar (1981–)
Ebru Günay (1982–)
Ehsan Fatahian (1982–)
Fidan Doğan (1982–2013)
Gökay Akbulut (1982–)
Jwan Hesso (1982–)
Majid Kavian (1982–2011)
Zeynab Jalalian (1982–)
Behrouz Boochani (1983–)
Belçim Bilgin (1983–)
Burhan G (1983–)
Chopy Fatah (1983–)
Mohammedali Yaseen Taha (1983–)
Salt Bae (1983–)
Selçuk Şahin (footballer born 1983)
Shwan Jalal (1983–)
Sohrab Pournazeri (1983–)
Taban Shoresh (1983–)
Zara (Russian singer) (1983–)
Ali Hama Saleh (1984–)
Bovar Karim (1984–)
Dilo Doxan (1984–)
Hevrin Khalaf (1984–)
Jassim Mohammed Haji (1984–)
Kawa Hesso (1984–)
Sherwan Haji (1985–)
Haftbefehl (1985–)
Isaac Tutumlu (1985–)
Sane Jaleh (1985–2011)
Bengin Ahmad (1986–)
Dashni Morad (1986–)
Hanna Jaff (1986–)
Kadir Talabani (1986–)
Navid Mohammadzadeh (1986–)
Rang Shawkat (1986–)
Ziaeddin Niknafs (1986–)
Brwa Nouri (1987–)
Dara Mohammed (1987–)
Darin (1987–)
Leyla İmret (1987–)
Ömer Öcalan (1987–)
Rawez Lawan (1987–)
Voria Ghafouri (1987–)
Eren Derdiyok (1988–)
Halgurd Mulla Mohammed (1988–)
Helly Luv (1988–)
KC Rebell (1988–)
Kurdo (rapper) (1988–)
Leila Mustafa (1988–)
Lilla Namo (1988–)
Makwan Amirkhani (1988–)
Nûdem Durak (1988–)
Zyzz (1989–2011)
Bahare Alavi (1989–2011) 
Rezan Zuğurlu (1988/9–)
Ahmad Al Saleh (1989–)
Aram Khalili (1989–)
Deniz Naki (1989–)
Tuğba Hezer Öztürk (1989–)
Capo (rapper) (1990–)
Jiloan Hamad (1990–)
Mervan Çelik (1990–)
Kianoush Rostami (1991–)
Helin Bölek (1992–2020)
Kaveh Rezaei (1992–)
Nur Tatar (1992–)
Lanja Khawe (1993–)
Nadia Murad (1993–)
NOURI (1993–)
Ramin Hossein-Panahi (1995–2018)
Reynmen (1995–)
Mahmoud Dahoud (1996–)
Zeki Majed (1996–)
Dersim Dağ (1996–)
Berkin Elvan (1999–2014)
Eno (rapper) (1998–)
Fero47 (1998–)

Others

Ahmet Dağtekin
Ala Talabani
Dindar Najman
Fadhil Omer
Habibollah Latifi
Howar Ziad
Ibrahim Alizade
Îlham Ehmed
Musa Herdem
Nuriye Kesbir
Rebwar Fatah
Riya Qahtan
Ari Shwan

References

Lists of people by ethnicity